The Center for Advanced Life Cycle Engineering (CALCE) is a university research facility focused on risk assessment, management, and mitigation for electronic products and systems.  CALCE is the largest electronic products and systems research center focused on electronics reliability and is dedicated to providing a knowledge and resource base to support the development of competitive electronic components, products, and systems. CALCE is located at the University of Maryland in College Park, Maryland, and was founded by Professor Michael Pecht.

Overview 

CALCE was created in 1985 with support from the United States National Science Foundation as a University Industry Cooperative Research Center. Since that time, CALCE has made significant contributions in the following areas:
 Design for Reliability and Physics-based Reliability Assessment
 Accelerated Test Methods
 Industry Standards Development
 Electronics Supply Chain Management
 Reliability Analysis and Qualification
 Life Cycle Management and Obsolescence Management
 Prognostics and Health Management

CALCE has been a leader in the development of a number of IEEE, JEDEC, GEIA, and IEC Standards. CALCE publications have also influenced a number of crucial industry standards, including:
 IEEE 1332: Reliability Program Standard
 IEEE 1624: Guide for Organizational Reliability Capability
 IEEE 1413: Standard Methodology for Reliability Prediction and Assessment for Electronic Systems and Equipment
 JEP 148: Reliability Qualification of Semiconductor Devices Based on Physics of Failure Risk and Opportunity Assessment
 GEIA-STD-0005-2: Standard for Mitigating the Effects of Tin Whiskers in Aerospace and High Performance Electronic Systems
 IEC/PAS 62240 (also released as GEIA 4900): Use of Semiconductor Devices Outside Manufacturers’ Specified Temperature Ranges

In the field of reliability analysis and qualification, CALCE processes and models have become standardized for physics-of-failure (PoF) based analyses of electronic systems. CALCE's achievements in reliability analysis and qualification include the concept of organizational reliability as the measure of the effectiveness of an organization's reliability program in terms of meeting customer requirements.

A range of industries, including aerospace, automotive, household, industrial, medical, and telecommunication, actively use CALCE Simulation Assisted Reliability Assessment (SARA) software and accelerated testing approaches. Among organizations applying CALCE methods, the U.S. Army leads the way, creating and maintaining a PoF analysis group that uses calceSARA software and techniques to assess electronic designs for U.S. DoD programs. In one example application, analysis results from the calceSARA software were used to save $27 million in sustainment costs. NASA also applies CALCE PoF models in planning manned missions to the moon and Mars. International corporations such as Boeing, Daimler, General Electric, General Motors, and Vestas use CALCE PoF models to incorporate power electronic modules into products such as aircraft and hybrid vehicles.

CALCE is at the forefront of research in Prognostics and Health Management (PHM). CALCE formed the first collaborative research effort to address PHM applications. Through the work of their PHM Consortium, CALCE has developed a new paradigm for reliability prediction based on prognostics whereby sensor data is integrated into models that enable in-situ assessment of the deviation of a product from its expected normal operating condition. Additionally, CALCE has developed a prognostics roadmap that will be included in the ITRI semiconductor roadmap. In the field of Electronic Part Supply Chain Management, CALCE is the preeminent technical organization for thermal up-rating, counterfeit electronic part management, and electronic part obsolescence forecasting and management. CALCE developed the concept of up-rating, a process that mitigates the risk associated with using semiconductor devices outside manufacturer specifications. CALCE also developed the first quantitative analysis of lifetime buy sizes for electronic parts, which has allowed electronics integrators to reduce their stock inventories and save money.

CALCE's parts management methodology forms the core of the Electronic Components Management Plan for the commercial avionics industry. CALCE has developed a number of methodologies, including obsolescence forecasting algorithms, which are used in leading tools and databases (i2, QTEC, PartMiner, and SiliconExpert). CALCE is also a leading supplier of tools and methodologies for strategic management of long field life systems. CALCE developed the most widely used methodology for managing electronic part obsolescence, which is employed by organizations such as Motorola, Northrop Grumman, and the U.S. DoD. For example, by applying CALCE methodologies, Motorola avoided $33 million in cost. Northrop Grumman was able to predict refresh dates for its F-22 radar 5 years earlier than previously possible.

CALCE researchers and faculty have also created a graduate-level electronic product and systems curriculum at the University of Maryland that has graduated over 250 engineers. In addition to the graduate program, CALCE also provides professional development courses and Web-based seminars to engineers working in the industry.

In 2008, CALCE was recognized by the United States National Science Foundation with the Alexander Schwarzkopf Prize for Technological Innovation. The Schwarzkopf Prize is awarded to former and current National Science Foundation (NSF) Industry/University Cooperative Research Centers that have had a significant impact on the world. CALCE won the award for its research on physics-of-failure reliability analysis methods and advanced supply chain management concepts for electronic products and systems.

In 2009, CALCE received the Systems Engineering Excellence Award from the National Defense Industrial Association. The award was presented at the 12th Annual Systems Engineering Conference in San Diego, California. The award was established in 2003 to honor Lt. Gen. Thomas R. Ferguson, Jr., USAF, whose leadership embodied the highest ideals in Defense Systems development and deployment. The award was given to CALCE for demonstrating outstanding achievement in the practical application of Systems Engineering principles, promotion of robust systems engineering principles throughout the organization, and effective systems engineering process development during the previous year. CALCE systems engineering contributions have helped achieve significant cost savings through new and enhanced processes, procedures and/or concepts, increased mission capabilities, and substantially increased performance.

In 2013, CALCE received the IEEE EAB/SA Standards Education Award. The award presented by the IEEE Educational Activities Board (EAB) and Standards Association Board of Governors (SA) was established to recognize those who have actively promoted the integration of standard into academic and corporate development programs, provided support for education about standards, promoted the importance of standards, made significant contributions of standards education materials, and provided content to support education about the standards setting process.  The award is presented “for continued leadership in developing and promoting standards education in the field of reliability engineering.”

See also 
 Physics of Failure
 Prognostics

References

Research institutes in Maryland
Multidisciplinary research institutes
University of Maryland Global Campus
Engineering research institutes